In mathematical logic, an omega-categorical theory is a theory that has exactly one countably infinite model up to isomorphism.  Omega-categoricity is the special case κ =  = ω of κ-categoricity, and omega-categorical theories are also referred to as ω-categorical.  The notion is most important for countable first-order theories.

Equivalent conditions for omega-categoricity

Many conditions on a theory are equivalent to the property of omega-categoricity. In 1959 Erwin Engeler, Czesław Ryll-Nardzewski and Lars Svenonius, proved several independently. Despite this, the literature still widely refers to the Ryll-Nardzewski theorem as a name for these conditions. The conditions included with the theorem vary between authors.

Given a countable complete first-order theory T with infinite models, the following are equivalent:
 The theory T is omega-categorical.
 Every countable model of T has an oligomorphic automorphism group (that is, there are finitely many orbits on Mn for every n).
 Some countable model of T has an oligomorphic automorphism group.
 The theory T has a model which, for every natural number n, realizes only finitely many n-types, that is, the Stone space Sn(T) is finite.
 For every natural number n, T has only finitely many n-types.
 For every natural number n, every n-type is isolated.
 For every natural number n, up to equivalence modulo T there are only finitely many formulas with n free variables, in other words, for every n, the nth Lindenbaum–Tarski algebra of T is finite.
 Every model of T is atomic.
 Every countable model of T is atomic.
 The theory T has a countable atomic and saturated model.
 The theory T has a saturated prime model.

Examples

The theory of any countably infinite structure which is homogeneous over a finite relational language is omega-categorical. Hence, the following theories are omega-categorical:
The theory of dense linear orders without endpoints (Cantor's isomorphism theorem)
The theory of the Rado graph
The theory of infinite linear spaces over any finite field

Notes

References
 
 
 
 
 
 
 

Model theory
Mathematical theorems